Sophocles was an ancient Greek playwright.

Sophocles may also refer to:

 Sophocles (given name), a list of people named Sophocles or Sofoklis
 Evangelinos Apostolides Sophocles (1807–1883), professor of classics and Modern Greek, and lexicographer
 , a cargo liner renamed Sophocles in 1900
 , an ocean liner
 Sophocles (crater), on the planet Mercury
 Sophocles (software), film and television screenwriting software